Czechoslovakia is a nation that competed at four consecutive Hopman Cup tournaments and first competed in the inaugural Hopman Cup in 1989, winning the event. This was their only time winning the event, but they did finish as the runners-up in 1992.

Since the peaceful split of Czechoslovakia into the Czech Republic and Slovakia at the start of 1993, both new nations have competed in the Hopman Cup.

Players
This is a list of players who have played for Czechoslovakia in the Hopman Cup.

Results

1 The men's singles dead rubber in the final against Australia was not played due to Pat Cash of Australia suffering illness during the mixed doubles.

References

See also
Czech Republic at the Hopman Cup
Slovakia at the Hopman Cup

Hopman Cup teams
Hopman Cup